Religious economy may refer to:
 Theory of religious economy, the interpretation of religious persons and organizations interacting within a market framework of competing groups and ideologies.

It could also refer to:
 Buddhist economics, a spiritual and philosophical approach to the study of economics
 Cultural economics, the branch of economics that studies the relation of culture to economic outcomes
 Christian finance, ethical finance following Christian ethics
 Economic imperialism (economics)
 Economics of religion, the application of economic theory and methods to explain the religious behaviour of individuals and groups
 Female labor force in the Muslim world
 Institutional economics, the study of role of institutions and evolutionary processes in shaping economic behaviour
 Islamic economics
 Jewish business ethics, ethical issues that arise in a business environment using Jewish ethics
 New institutional economics, the study of social and legal norms and rules that underlie economic activity
 Religion and business
 Sociology of religion, the study of the beliefs, practices, and organizational forms of religion using the methods of sociology
 Wealth and religion